Interstate 69 (I-69) is an Interstate Highway in the United States currently consisting of 10 unconnected segments with an original continuous segment from Indianapolis, Indiana, northeast to the Canadian border in Port Huron, Michigan, at . The remaining separated segments are variously completed and posted or not posted sections of an extension southwest to the Mexican border in Texas. Of this extension—nicknamed the NAFTA Superhighway because it would help trade with Canada and Mexico spurred by the North American Free Trade Agreement (NAFTA)—five pieces near Corpus Christi, Texas; Houston, Texas; northwestern Mississippi; Memphis, Tennessee; and Evansville, Indiana, have been built or upgraded and signposted as I-69. A sixth segment of I-69 through Kentucky utilizing that state's existing parkway system and a section of I-24 was established by federal legislation in 2008, but only a portion is signposted.

The proposed extension evolved from the combination of Corridors 18 and 20 of the National Highway System as designated in the Intermodal Surface Transportation Efficiency Act of 1991 (ISTEA), but the federally recognized corridor also includes connecting and existing infrastructure, including I-94 between Chicago, Illinois, and Port Huron, Michigan, and several spurs from I-69. Among these proposed spurs are an extension of I-530 from Pine Bluff, Arkansas; an upgrade of U.S. Route 59 (US 59) from Texarkana, Texas; and a split in southern Texas to serve three border crossings at Laredo, Pharr, and Brownsville.

In August 2007, I-69 was selected by the United States Department of Transportation (USDOT) as one of six Corridors of the Future, making it eligible for additional federal funding and streamlined planning and review. This funding has since been withheld, causing some states to suspend completion of the entire route until federal funding is restored.

Route description

I-69 currently exists as a number of distinct segments, mostly corresponding to defined sections of independent utility (SIUs):
 The original (with later additions), fully completed route from Indianapolis, Indiana, to the Blue Water Bridge at Port Huron, Michigan (SIU 1);
 Portions of the Indianapolis beltway (I-465), though not currently signed as such (SIU 2);
 A  section including both the former I-164 near Evansville, Indiana, north from a temporary end at US 41; signed as I-69 in 2014 (SIU 4) to I-64, and onward north to State Road 37 (SR 37) near Martinsville, Indiana, Sections 1–5 of (SIU 3);
 The upgraded portions of the Kentucky Parkway System: Purchase, Western Kentucky, and Pennyrile parkways; in addition to a portion of I-24 (SIU 5) and (SIU 6);
 A  section from Tunica Resorts, Mississippi, to the I-40/I-69/State Route 300 (SR 300) interchange in Memphis, Tennessee, part of (SIU 9) and (SIU 10);
 The existing US 59 freeway from Rosenberg, Texas, to Cleveland, Texas, (SIU 19);
 A  segment of US 77 from south of State Highway 44 (SH 44) to I-37 near Corpus Christi, Texas, (SIU 22), designated as I-69 in August 2011 and redesignated as I-69E on May 30, 2013;
 An  section of US 281 from I-2 in Pharr, Texas, to Edinburg, Texas, designated as I-69C on May 30, 2013;
 A  section of US 77 (and part of US 83) from the Veterans International Bridge at Brownsville, Texas, to north of Raymondville, Texas, designated as I-69E on May 30, 2013 (SIU 23); and
A  section of both US 59 and State Highway Loop 20 (Loop 20) in Laredo, Texas, between the World Trade International Bridge and I-35, designated as I-69W on June 17, 2014.

|-
|TX ||
|-
|LA || ||
|-
|AR || ||
|-
|MS ||
|-
|TN ||
|-
|KY ||
|-
|IN ||
|-
|MI ||
|-
|Total ||
|}

The original portion of I-69 in Indiana (SIU 1 of the overall national plan) starts at an interchange with I-465, the beltway around Indianapolis on the northeast side of that city. I-69 heads northeast to near Anderson, where it turns more easterly to provide indirect access to Muncie before turning more northerly toward Marion and Fort Wayne. In Fort Wayne, I-69 runs along the western edge of the city while I-69's first (and for many years only) signed auxiliary route, I-469, loops east of the city. After crossing the Indiana East–West Toll Road (I-80/I-90) near Angola and Fremont, I-69 enters Michigan just south of Kinderhook.

I-69 in Michigan runs north passing through Coldwater and Marshall. There, it crosses I-94 east of Battle Creek. Near Olivet, I-69 begins to turn in a northeasterly direction, passing through the Lansing–East Lansing metropolitan area. Here, I-69 is cosigned with I-96 as an overlap west of Lansing, the only such palindromic pairing in the Interstate Highway System. Where it splits from I-96, I-69 turns east, both in compass direction and in signed direction, and heads north of Lansing and through Flint (where it crosses I-75) to a junction with I-94 just outside Port Huron. At its eastern terminus, I-69 joins I-94 to the Blue Water Bridge across the St. Clair River, where traffic continues on Highway 402 in the Canadian province of Ontario to London, Ontario.

The new section of I-69 in southern Indiana presently begins at the US 41 interchange south of Evansville at the former southern terminus of I-164. From there, it runs first east, then north, meeting SR 662, SR 66, and SR 62. At exit 18, SR 57 joins I-69 on a concurrency. Shortly thereafter, it meets I-64 at a cloverleaf interchange. From there, it runs north to SR 68. Construction was completed on November 19, 2012, on a  segment (SIU 3, Sections 1–3). This extension takes the route north-northeast from there to SR 64 near Oakland City, then north-northeast to US 50/US 150 at Washington, and finally northeast to US 231 near Naval Surface Warfare Center Crane Division (NSWC Crane Division). Construction for the final new terrain segment (SIU 3, Section 4), which takes I-69 from NSWC Crane Division northeast to SR 37 on the southwest side of Bloomington, was completed in December 2015 and was extended north to Martinsville in late 2018 (Section 5). Section 6 (Martinsville to Indianapolis) of I-69's SIU 3 is currently being upgraded to full Interstate Highway standards all the way north-northeast to I-465 on the southwest side of Indianapolis.

The new I-69 in Mississippi and Tennessee starts at an at-grade intersection with the former route of Mississippi Highway 304 (MS 304) in Banks, Tunica County, Mississippi. It continues roughly north-northeast, crossing into DeSoto County to a partial interchange with the current route of MS 304, then runs easterly to an interchange with I-55 in northern Hernando. It then continues north, overlapping I-55 to the Tennessee state line, and continues northward concurrently with I-55 to the south side of Memphis. It then follows I-240 northward through downtown before joining I-40. Presently, the northern end of this section of I-69 is at the I-40/I-69/SR 300 interchange on the north side of Memphis. This portion of the route was the first SIU of the proposed extension to be signed as part of the national I-69 route, and the first portion designed as part of the extension.

Planned and delayed extensions

Past progress

On June 6, 2008, President George W. Bush signed HR 1195, designating the Purchase Parkway as Future I-69. Kentucky officials planned to place I-69 signs on the Pennyrile Parkway, Western Kentucky Parkway, and Purchase Parkway in 2008, but the Federal Highway Administration (FHWA) had not yet given Kentucky approval to do so for the entire route. Kentucky was making spot improvements to its parkways to bring them up to Interstate Highway standards in anticipation of the I-69 designation. Meanwhile, Indiana examined building most of SIU 3 as a toll road but quickly reverted to making it toll-free in 2006 with an announcement to that effect by Indiana Governor Mitch Daniels after widespread opposition from I-69 opponents and supporters alike. Indiana had been using funds from the $3.8-billion Indiana Toll Road lease deal along with public–private partnerships to construct SIU 3 between Indianapolis and Evansville.

, SIU 1 (all of original I-69 north of Indianapolis, plus the I-469 loop around Fort Wayne) and SIU 2 were open, as was SIU 5 in Kentucky, part of SIU 9 in the Memphis, Tennessee, area, and the short SIU 10 in northwestern Mississippi. SIU 6 in Kentucky was built as a freeway but was not yet up to Interstate standards in all areas. At around the same time, Texas was actively pursuing completing its portion of I-69 by upgrading existing U.S. Routes and state highways along the I-69 corridor to Interstate standards. Several portions of the 15 SIUs in Texas were being worked on, with active construction in progress on US 59 from SH 99 to Kendleton (SIU 20), and on US 77 between Robstown and Kingsville (SIU 22). , four mainline SIUs outside of Texas were under construction; SIU 3 in Indiana (using $700 million (equivalent to $ in ) from the 2006 Major Moves deal), SIU 7 and SIU 9 in Tennessee; and a small part of SIU 13 in Arkansas (Monticello Bypass). Portions of these SIUs have been open to traffic since 2007.

Progress delays
While federal legislation established a mandate to extend I-69 from Indiana to Texas, it did not provide funding for its construction. I-69 construction must compete against other projects for traditional funding. Despite approval of several segments, work has been completed on only a few scattered segments due in part to increasing costs for construction materials and machinery. As a result, several states have indicated that construction of I-69 may not be possible without the use of tolls as the primary means to finance building the highway. Tennessee, Arkansas, and Mississippi passed legislation authorizing toll roads within each state but have not applied tolling to their sections of I-69 due to the widespread unpopularity of toll roads in these states. A bridge over the Ohio River, which was to have been built along I-69 to connect Indiana with Kentucky, stalled in 2004 because each state did not have enough funding for it. In 2016, both states reached an agreement to restart environmental studies and develop a funding strategy for the Ohio River crossing. Tennessee and Mississippi have suspended work on I-69 indefinitely due to a lack of funding to build the highway outside of the Memphis metropolitan area. Arkansas has halted work on its mainline portion of I-69, aside from the Monticello Bypass, although it has applied for a federal grant to complete design and construction for the  section between Monticello and McGehee.

Current progress and plans

Texas, Kentucky, and Indiana have been slowly advancing construction of I-69 within each state through traditional funding sources when available and innovative financing methods, such as public–private partnerships. In December 2018, the I-69 River Crossing project team for Kentucky and Indiana announced a preferred plan to build a new toll bridge across the Ohio River as part of I-69.

In 2021, Tennessee announced it was reviving construction of segment 7 of I-69 in northwestern Tennessee to link it to I-55 on the west side of the Mississippi River. This will provide an interim direct freeway link to Memphis that will bypass the suspended segment 8 pending its eventual completion to take I-69 even more directly into Memphis. The Tennessee Department of Transportation (TDOT) halted the Interstate work about four years earlier because they lacked federal funding for the project. The revived portion of I-69 will run from the Kentucky state line to Dyersburg where it will connect with I-155, a spur that crosses the Mississippi River and extends to I-55 in southeastern Missouri. From there, I-55 extends south running parallel to the Mississippi River on the Missouri–Arkansas side then crosses the river into Memphis.

Texas

In Texas, I-69 planning has become part of the Trans-Texas Corridor (TTC) studies. This part of the TTC, called I-69/TTC, includes I-69 and all of its spurs authorized by Congress. It will extend from three border crossings, at Laredo, Pharr, and Brownsville, along US 59, US 281, and US 77 toward Victoria. After the three branches join, I-69 will continue along the general US 59 corridor through Houston to Tenaha, where it will turn easterly to Louisiana along US 84. In Greater Houston, I-69 will follow the US 59 freeway corridor through town. A branch (I-369) continues north on US 59 from Tenaha to Texarkana, where it will eventually connect to I-30 and I-49. Most of the proposed I-69 route in Texas already exists as four-lane highways, with a lengthy freeway section stretching north and south of Houston along US 59 and shorter freeway sections of US 77, US 83, and US 281 in the Lower Rio Grande Valley.

The I-69/TTC project has been split into 15 SIUs, which match the original ones but do not share numbers. SIUs 1 to 8 (original 16 to 23) cover the mainline along the "Interstate 69 East" branch to the Mexican border at Brownsville. The "Interstate 69 Central" branch to Pharr is SIUs 9, 11, and 12 (original 24 to 26). The "Interstate 369" and "Interstate 69 West" branches to Texarkana and the Mexican border at Laredo, respectively, are SIUs 13 and 14 (original 29 and 30), and two connections to Brownsville and Pharr are SIUs 10 and 15 (original 31 and 32). The I-69/TTC study also includes SIU L-CC, a connection between Freer and Corpus Christi that was not in the 2000 study. The Texas Department of Transportation (TxDOT) originally considered building the I-69/TTC over new terrain paralleling US 59, US 77, and US 281.

Responding to widespread opposition from environmental groups and property rights activists, TxDOT announced in June 2008 that it will complete I-69 by upgrading the existing US 59, US 77, and US 281 roadways to Interstate standards through rural areas, with bypasses around urban centers along the route. Instead of building the Trans-Texas Corridor as originally planned, TxDOT now plans to finance upgrading the existing highways to I-69 through private sector investment. Under the proposed arrangement, I-69 would remain toll-free where it overlaps preexisting highways, while bypasses of cities may be tolled. The private firms awarded contracts for I-69 would also build and operate toll roads throughout the state; some of those revenues would then be applied to I-69 construction.

A stated goal of TxDOT's I-69 initiative is that "existing suitable freeway sections of the proposed system be designated as I-69 as soon as possible". In response to TxDOT's request, a  segment of US 77 between I-37 and SH 44 near Corpus Christi was approved for the "I-69" designation by the FHWA in August 2011 and was approved by the American Association of State Highway and Transportation Officials (AASHTO) in October 2011; signage was posted at an official ceremony on December 5, 2011; it was resigned as I-69E on May 29, 2013.

At the May 18, 2012, meeting of AASHTO,  of US 59 from I-610 in Houston to Fostoria Road in Liberty County were also approved as ready for I-69 signage.

On May 29, 2013, the Texas Transportation Commission gave approval to naming completed Interstate-standard segments of US 77 and US 281 as I-69. US 77 through Cameron and Willacy counties will be signed as I-69E, including  of existing freeway starting at the Rio Grande in Brownsville and running north past Raymondville. The  of US 281 freeway in Pharr and Edinburg will be signed as I-69C.

The section of US 59 inside the I-610 loop that runs through Downtown Houston was approved by the FHWA for designation as I-69 on March 9, 2015, and approved for signage as such by the Texas Transportation Commission on March 24, 2015.

Louisiana, Arkansas, and Mississippi

The nearly  portion of the I-69 extension from south of Clarksdale, Mississippi, to the Louisiana–Texas state line is planned to be built as a new-terrain route that parallels existing U.S. Routes and state highways in some locations. As well as covering the part in Texas northeast of Nacogdoches, SIU 16 also extends into Louisiana, ending at US 171 near Stonewall. SIU 15 continues around the south and east sides of the Shreveport area, crossing I-49 and ending at I-20 near Haughton. SIU 14 extends northeast from I-20 to US 82 near El Dorado, Arkansas, and SIU 13 continues northeast to US 65 near McGehee, mainly paralleling US 278. Also included in Corridor 18, as SIU 28, is an extension of I-530 from Pine Bluff south along the US 425 corridor to I-69 west of Monticello; a short piece at the south end opened in mid-2006 as Highway 530 (AR 530). Another segment of AR 530 opened in 2013 and another in 2015. A segment bypassing Monticello, Arkansas, was opened on October 11, 2018, with another segment to McGehee started constructed in late 2022. The Charles W. Dean Bridge, SIU 12, is planned to cross the Mississippi River between McGehee, Arkansas, and Benoit, Mississippi, while SIU 11 will parallel US 61 to Tunica Resorts. SIU 10, the first completed portion of the I-69 extension, runs east from Tunica Resorts to I-55 near Hernando and opened in late 2006. With the record of decision signed in 2007, the FHWA authorized the Mississippi Department of Transportation (MDOT) to add I-69 signs on I-55 from the I-55/I-69 interchange in Hernando to the Tennessee state line.

Tennessee, Kentucky, and southern Indiana

From a point south of Clarksdale, Mississippi, to Henderson, Kentucky, most of the I-69 alignment is planned to consist of upgrades to existing U.S. Highways, Interstates and substandard freeways, although some sections are expected be built as bypasses around cities and towns along the route.

I-69 SIU 9 overlaps I-55 into Memphis, Tennessee, switching there to I-240 and then I-40 before leaving onto the short SR 300 connection and then paralleling US 51 to near Millington. On January 18, 2008, the FHWA authorized TDOT to erect I-69 signs on I-55, I-240, and I-40 from the Mississippi state line to the I-40/SR 300 interchange. The recently completed I-269 will bypass this part of I-69, beginning where I-69 joins I-55 in Mississippi and ending near Millington, and will include the northern part of SR 385 near Millington. SIU 8 is planned to continue beyond Millington, near US 51, to I-155 near Dyersburg. Despite these plans, it is unclear if the entire I-69 project in Tennessee will ever be completed. The state has suspended work indefinitely on the  SIU 8 and the remaining  unbuilt portion of SIU 9 between SR 300 and the northern end of I-269 near Millington due to a lack of federal funding. Work on SIU 7 was also suspended for a few years, but this project has now been revived by the state which has decided there's value in having a continuous chain of freeways running partly on other completed Interstates between Memphis and the Kentucky state line. SIU 7 follows the existing US 51 freeway with new bypasses to the state line at Fulton, Kentucky. Completion of this stretch of I-69 is expected to be achieved by 2023. After that, Tennessee–Missouri–Arkansas I-55 link to I-155 which crosses back across the Mississippi River to the newly completed I-69 will serve as the main freeway routes between Memphis and northwestern Tennessee, at least on an interim basis.

In Kentucky, I-69 mostly follows existing freeways originally built as toll roads. SIU 6 follows the Julian M. Carroll Purchase Parkway and I-24 from Fulton to Eddyville, while SIU 5 continues along the Wendell H. Ford Western Kentucky Parkway and the Edward T. Breathitt Pennyrile Parkway from Eddyville to Henderson. While these parkways received the I-69 designation by federal legislation signed in 2008, upgrades have been necessary to bring the freeways to Interstate standards—but required less work compared to other states where entirely new highway must be built. A number of construction contracts have been let by the state of Kentucky to reconfigure several interchanges along the parkways. Many of these interchanges were originally designed with opposing loop ramps to accommodate toll barriers at the interchanges; these "tollbooth" style interchanges were (or will be) reconfigured to standard diamond interchanges as part of the parkways' conversion to I-69.

On August 31, 2011, Kentucky Governor Steve Beshear announced an agreement between the state and the FHWA which allowed the Kentucky Transportation Cabinet (KYTC) to erect I-69 signage along the new Interstate's  overlap with I-24 and the  stretch of the Western Kentucky Parkway between I-24 and the Pennyrile Parkway. Signage was placed in late 2011, with construction on necessary upgrades of the portion of the Western Kentucky Parkway expected to be bid in September. On October 25, 2011, I-69 was officially designated by Beshear along a  stretch of I-24 and the Western Kentucky Parkway between Calvert City and Nortonville. Signage and milemarkers were replaced on the  stretch of the Western Kentucky Parkway in mid-December 2012. An additional  along the Pennyrile Parkway from the Western Kentucky Parkway to Kentucky Route 425 (KY 425), south of Henderson, was designated and resigned on November 16, 2015.  The Purchase Parkway between Mayfield and Calvert City was signed in July 2018.

The Indiana and Kentucky governors agreed on June 30, 2016, to spend a combined $17 million (equivalent to $ in ) for an environmental and design study to determine how the two states will pay for a bridge spanning the Ohio River and where it will run. This is the second study conducted by the two states. The first study was commissioned in 2001, and a preliminary report in 2004 put the cost of a bridge at $1.4 billion (equivalent to $ in ). Only a draft environmental report was issued at this time; no final environmental report or approval was issued due to a lack of money. The bridge is the last remaining piece to connect the two states. The preferred alternative for SIU 4 was to leave the Pennyrile Parkway near its north end and cross the Ohio River to I-164 near Evansville, Indiana, and then use I-164 to I-64. At the October 18, 2013, AASHTO meeting, an Indiana Department of Transportation (INDOT) request to redesignate I-164 as part of I-69 was approved, pending concurrence from the FHWA.

SIU 3, connecting I-69 to I-465 in southern Indianapolis, will roughly parallel SR 57 and SR 45 and will use an upgraded version of the existing SR 37 from just south of Bloomington to a point just south of Indianapolis. A  stretch from Evansville to NSWC Crane Division was completed on November 19, 2012, and the remaining  portion to Bloomington opened to traffic on December 9, 2015. Construction on upgrading a  section of SR 37 from Bloomington to just south of Martinsville to Interstate standards was completed in late 2018. Construction began on the final segment from Martinsville to Indianapolis in 2019, with completion anticipated by the end of 2024. SIU 2 will follow the southeastern quarter of I-465 around the city.

History

Original route

A route from I-465 in Indianapolis northeast via Fort Wayne to I-80/I-90 near Angola was added to the proposed "Interregional Highway System" by the early 1940s. Unlike most of the routes, it was not drawn along an existing U.S. Route corridor, except north of Fort Wayne (where it used US 27); most of it ran roughly parallel to SR 9 and SR 37. The extension beyond Angola to I-94 near Marshall, Michigan, actually started out as part of what evolved into I-94. On early plans, the Chicago–Detroit route would have replaced US 112 (now US 12), splitting from I-80/I-90 at South Bend. By 1947, the route had been shifted north to present I-94, along what was then US 12, but the connection to South Bend remained, splitting at Kalamazoo.

The I-69 designation was assigned to the Indianapolis–Angola route in 1957, while the short South Bend–Kalamazoo route became proposed I-67. The I-67 designation was shifted east to the US 27 corridor by early 1958, eventually being absorbed into the extension of I-69 to I-94 near Marshall which was built in 1967. The Federal-Aid Highway Act of 1968 authorized an additional  of Interstates to be chosen by the FHWA; among Michigan's proposals was a  extension of I-69 northeast and east via US 27 to Lansing, M-78 to Flint, and M-21 to Port Huron. However, the FHWA initially only approved the route to I-475 in Flint. The continuation to Port Huron was eventually approved in February 1987. Michigan's  portion of the Interstate Highway System was completed in 1992, when the last piece of I-69 opened southwest of Lansing between I-96 and Charlotte.

Extended route

ISTEA included two High Priority Corridors that would later become parts of a proposed crosscountry extension of I-69:
 (18) Corridor from Indianapolis, Indiana, to Memphis, Tennessee, via Evansville, Indiana.
 (20) US 59 Corridor from the Mexican border in Laredo, Texas, through Houston, to the vicinity of Texarkana, Texas.
Corridor 18 was extended southwest to Houston, where it connected to Corridor 20, by the Department of Transportation and Related Agencies Appropriations Act, 1993; the new definition read "Corridor from Indianapolis, Indiana, through Evansville, Indiana, Memphis, Tennessee, Shreveport/Bossier, Louisiana, and to Houston, Texas." The National Highway System Designation Act of 1995 made further amendments to the description of Corridor 18, specifying that it would serve Mississippi and Arkansas, extending it south to the Mexican border in the Lower Rio Grande Valley and adding a short connection at Brownsville, Texas. This act also specified that Corridors 18 and 20 were "future parts of the Interstate System" to become actual Interstates when built to Interstate Highway standards and connected to other Interstates. Although the act designated Corridor 9 as I-99, no number was assigned to Corridors 18 and 20 yet.

The Transportation Equity Act for the 21st Century (TEA-21), enacted in 1998, greatly expanded the definition of Corridor 18 to include the existing I-69, as well as I-94 between Port Huron, Michigan, and Chicago, Illinois. A connection to Pine Bluff, Arkansas, was added, and the extension to the Lower Rio Grande Valley was detailed as splitting into two routes just south of Victoria, one following US 77 and the other following US 59 and US 281 to the Rio Grande. This act also assigned the I-69 designation to Corridors 18 and 20, with the branches on US 77, US 281, and US 59 to the Rio Grande being "Interstate 69 East", "Interstate 69 Central", and "Interstate 69 West", respectively. With TEA-21, the I-69 extension took shape and remains today as those segments.

In 2000, Corridors 18 and 20 were split into 32 SIUs as part of the I-69 (Corridor 18) Special Environmental Study. In Texas, it was originally envisioned that private firms will build, operate, then transfer portions of the highway to the state after a specified period of time. Lawmakers in Kentucky once considered a bill that would authorize the re-tolling of three parkways slated to become part of I-69.

Opposition and controversy
The construction of the I-69 extension beyond Indianapolis has angered environmentalists. In particular, the southern portion of the route in Indiana would run through wetlands, existing farmland, and forested areas, and cut through geologically sensitive karst topography, which environmentalists argue threatens to pollute underground water systems and harm the rare species that live there. Fiscal conservatives also oppose completion of I-69, arguing that federal legislation establishing the I-69 corridor amounts to an unfunded mandate imposed by the federal government upon the states through which the highway will travel, as the legislation requires states to pursue construction of their portions of I-69 but provides no funding mechanism to cover its estimated $25-billion cost, thereby leaving cash-strapped states to figure out how to finance its construction. Three states (Louisiana, Mississippi, and Tennessee) have publicly stated they will not build their sections of I-69 until Congress appropriates funds to complete environmental studies, design, and construction in each state.

Junction list
Texas
  in Rosenberg. The highways travel concurrently to north-northeast of Splendora.

  Sam Houston Tollway in Houston
  in Houston
  in Houston
  in Houston
  in Houston
  Sam Houston Parkway in Houston
  Grand Parkway in New Caney
 Gap in route
Louisiana
 Unbuilt
Arkansas
 Unbuilt; two lanes of Monticello Bypass completed and signed as US-278 Bypass.
Mississippi
  east-northeast of Robinsonville.
  in Hernando. The highways travel concurrently to Memphis, Tennessee.
Tennessee
  in Memphis
  in Memphis. I-69/I-240 travels concurrently through Memphis.
  in Memphis
  in Memphis
  in Memphis. I-40/I-69 travels concurrently through Memphis.
 / in Memphis
 Gap in route
Kentucky
  in Mayfield
  south of Calvert City. The highways travel concurrently to Eddyville.
  in Calvert City
  in Kuttawa
  in Eddyville
  north-northeast of Nortonville
  in Madisonville
  near Henderson
 Gap in route
Indiana
  in Evansville
  west-northwest of Elberfeld
  east of Washington
  west-northwest of Scotland
  near Bloomington
 near Martinsville
 Gap in route
  in Indianapolis
  east-northeast of Alexandria. The highways travel concurrently to Gas City.
  in Markle
  east of Roanoke. I-69/US 33 travels concurrently to Fort Wayne.
  in Fort Wayne. The highways travel concurrently through Fort Wayne.
  in Fort Wayne. I-69/US 30 travels concurrently through Fort Wayne.
  in Fort Wayne
  in Fort Wayne
  west-northwest of Waterloo
  west of Angola
  west-northwest of Fremont
Michigan
  in Coldwater
  northwest of Marshall
  in Lansing. The highways travel concurrently to northwest of Waverly.
  west of Lansing
  north-northwest of East Lansing
  southwest of Flint
  in Flint
  north of Marysville. The highways travel concurrently to the Canada–United States border in Port Huron.
 / at the Canada–United States border in Port Huron

Auxiliary routes
 Interstate 69C (Texas)
 Interstate 69E (Texas)
 Interstate 69W (Texas)
 Interstate 69 Spur (Kentucky)—proposed
 Interstate 169 (Indiana)—proposed
 Interstate 169 (Kentucky)
 Interstate 169 (Tennessee)—proposed
 Interstate 169 (Texas)
 Interstate 269 (Indiana)—proposed
 Interstate 269 (Mississippi–Tennessee)
 Interstate 369 (Texas)
 Interstate 469 (Indiana)
 Interstate 569 (Kentucky)—proposed

See also

References

Further reading

External links

 I69Info.com
 Highway Position: Is an Indiana Congressman introducing legislation to change the name of Interstate 69? (Snopes.com)
 Official DOT websites:
 I-69 Indianapolis-Evansville Study (Indiana Department of Transportation, SIU 3)
 Interstate 69 in Tennessee (SIUs 7, 8, and 9)
 Shreveport bypass (SIU 15)
 I-69 Driven By Texans, a Texas Department of Transportation site

 
69